Longin Krčo (Serbian Cyrillic: Лонгин Крчо; born 29 September 1955) is a bishop of the Serbian Orthodox Church who became head of the Eparchy of New Gračanica and Midwestern America in October 1999. He is one of the longest-serving Serbian Orthodox bishops, and was the war-time Bishop of Dalmatia.

Life

Early life
He was born on 29 September 1955 to father Stanoje and mother Anđa (née Jovanović). He completed his elementary school in Olovske Luke and he then completed the Three Holy Hierarchs theological school at the Krka monastery. He was ordained a monk (being given the name Longin) in 1975 by the then-Bishop of Dalmatia Stefan (Boca) after receiving the Little Schema as a student of the fifth grade.

Bishop
Bishop Longin was the Bishop of Dalmatia during the war in Croatia from 1992 until 1999. He was unable to take his seat in Šibenik and used the Krka monastery as diocesan headquarters instead.

During Operation Storm, he was located in Australia but he quickly returned. After Operation Storm, he (and the whole seminary from the Krka monastery) stayed at Divčibare near Valjevo until 1999. He returned to Šibenik for the first time in 1998 for a meeting with Croatian bishop Ante Ivas.

References

1955 births
Living people
People from Olovo
Serbs of Bosnia and Herzegovina
20th-century Eastern Orthodox bishops
21st-century Eastern Orthodox bishops
Bishops of the Serbian Orthodox Church
Eastern Orthodox bishops in the United States